Hathor 30 - Coptic Calendar - Koiak 2

The first day of the Coptic month of Koiak, the fourth month of the Coptic year. On a common year, this day corresponds to November 27, of the Julian Calendar, and December 10, of the Gregorian Calendar. This day falls in the Coptic season of Peret, the season of emergence. This day falls in the Nativity Fast.

Commemorations

Saints 

 The departure of Pope John III, the fortieth Patriarch of the See of Saint Mark 
 The departure of Pope Athanasius III, the seventy-sixth Patriarch of the See of Saint Mark 
 The departure of Saint Peter of Edessa, the Bishop of Gaza

Other commemorations 

 The consecration of the Church of Saint Abe-Fam the Soldier, in the city of Abnub
 The consecration of the Church of Saint Shenouda the Archimandrite, the White Monastery

References 

Days of the Coptic calendar